The South Korean football league system contains two professional leagues, two semi-professional leagues, and various amateur leagues for Korean football clubs.

The highest level of football in South Korea is the K League 1, which was founded in 1983. K League 2 was founded in 2013 and is currently a second division. Below the level of the professional leagues are the semi-professional K3 League, which was founded in 2007 and refounded in 2020, and the K4 League, which was founded in 2020, and serve as the third division and fourth division, respectively.

There was no avenue for progression between any of the leagues until 2012, when the K League 2 was founded.

System by period 
Korean National Semi-Professional Football League was a semi-professional football league between corporate teams in South Korea from 1964 to 2002. In 1983, with the establishment of K League which is a professional league, Semi-professional League became the second tier and remained until 2002 before Korea National League was officially founded in 2003. The third tier K3 League was founded as an amateur league in 2007, and became the fourth tier after K League 2, the second division of the professional league, was founded in 2013. K3 League also divided into the Advanced and the Basic, and they became semi-Professional leagues with new names, K3 League (semi-professional) and K4 League, after the merger of National League in 2020. South Korean leagues are using systems of promotion and relegation in each of three classes: professional, semi-professional and amateur; but there are still no promotion and relegation between classes until 2022, when there will be a promotion and relegation system between K League 2 and K3 League from 2023.

Current system 
Outside this league structure, there are university, reserve and youth level competitions. University clubs' U-League and reserve teams' R League are operating independently from the league system. Relegation from K League 2 to K3 League from 2023 been introduced.

From 2023 season, K5 League switch from regional league to single national league. After two seasons of single national league implementation for two years, promotion system with the K4 League will be implemented from 2025.

Qualification for cups

Domestic cups 
All K League, K3 League and K4 League sides qualify for the Korean FA Cup tournament. The top eleven sides from the K5 League gained qualification to the 2020 season's FA Cup tournament. The Korean League Cup competition was open to K League teams only, whilst sides from the National League could compete in the National League Championship, but both were abolished.

Continental competition 
At present, four South Korean sides qualify automatically for the AFC Champions League. Three top teams from K League 1 automatically gains entry to the AFC Champions League. The Korean FA Cup winners also qualify for the AFC Champions League only. However, if the champions of Korean FA Cup are not members of K League, the fourth placed team of the K League 1 receive the entry spot.

See also 
 Football in South Korea
 K League
 List of South Korean football champions

References

External links 
K League  
K5 K6 K7 - KFA  
Korea National League  
Challengers League  
ROKfootball 

 
Football league systems in Asia